Kornelia or Kornélia is a given name of European origin. It is similar to Cornelia and Korneliya.

List of people with the given name 

 Kornélia Demény, Hungarian woman, wife of Albert Szent-Györgyi
 Kornelia Ender (born 1958), German retired swimmer
 Kornelia Gressler (born 1970), German retired swimmer
 Kornelia Kubińska (born 1985), Polish cross country skier
 Kornelia Kunisch (born 1959), former East German handball player
 Kornélia Ihász (born 1937), Hungarian speed skater
 Kornelia Moskwa (born 1996), Polish volleyball player
 Kornélia Pap (born 1930), Hungarian retired rower and journalist
 Kornelia Polyak, academic
 Kornélia Pongo (born 1976), Hungarian former competitive ice dancer
 Kornélia Prielle (1826–1906), Hungarian stage actress
 Kornelia Shilunga (born 1970), Namibian politician 
 Kornelia Smalla (born 1956), German chemist
 Kornelia Stawicka (born 1973), Polish swimmer
 Kornelia Winkel (born 1944), Dutch former swimmer

Given names
Feminine given names
German feminine given names
Hungarian feminine given names
Polish feminine given names
Dutch feminine given names